"Loving You" is a song by American recording artist Michael Jackson that was originally recorded before the Bad sessions in 1985 and the chorus section had notable similarities to "The Girl Is Mine". Matt Forger, one of Jackson's trusted engineers stated that, "It was a good song, just not in serious consideration for the album, Bad. One of many that were recorded and put away." A reworked version of the song was included in Jackson's posthumous album Xscape (2014).

Release
The song made its debut on May 6, 2014 on Epic Records and was available streaming for Epic Unlimited members.

Charts

See also
 List of unreleased Michael Jackson material
 Death of Michael Jackson

References

1985 songs
Michael Jackson songs
Song recordings produced by Michael Jackson
Song recordings produced by Timbaland
Song recordings produced by Jerome "J-Roc" Harmon
Songs written by Michael Jackson
Songs released posthumously
Pop ballads
Contemporary R&B ballads
Smooth jazz songs